Wawi is a tambon (subdistrict) of Mae Suai District, in Chiang Rai Province, Thailand. In 2018 it had a total population of 25,476 people.

History
The subdistrict was created effective September 15, 1979 by splitting off 10 administrative villages from Mae Suai.

Administration

Central administration
The tambon is subdivided into 27 administrative villages (muban).

Local administration
The whole area of the subdistrict is covered by the subdistrict administrative organization (SAO) Wawi (องค์การบริหารส่วนตำบลวาวี).

References

External links
Thaitambon.com on Wawi

Tambon of Chiang Rai province
Populated places in Chiang Rai province